Kent is a unincorporated small town in Marshall County, West Virginia, United States.  While having few residences, it is the location for an extensive range of industrial operations.

References 

Unincorporated communities in West Virginia
Unincorporated communities in Marshall County, West Virginia